In His Brother's Place is a 1919 American silent comedy-drama film, directed by Harry L. Franklin. It stars Hale Hamilton, Emmett C. King, and Ruby Lafayette, and was released on July 14, 1919.

Cast list
 Hale Hamilton as twin brothers, Nelson and J. Barrington Drake
 Emmett C. King as Jonathan Drake
 Ruby Lafayette as Amanda Drake
 Mary McIvor as Bessie Judd
 Marguerite Snow as Kitty Judd
 Jessie De Jarnette as Martha Judd
 Howard Crampton as Abel Cruck
 Ward Wing as Abel Cruck, Jr.

References

External links 
 
 
 

Metro Pictures films
Films directed by Harry L. Franklin
1910s English-language films
1919 comedy-drama films
American silent feature films
American black-and-white films
1919 films
1910s American films
Silent American comedy-drama films